Puliyantivu (Koṭidūva) is an island off the coast of Jaffna peninsula in northern Sri Lanka, located approximately  west of the city of Jaffna.

References

Islands of Jaffna District
Island North DS Division